The 1958–59 1re série season was the 38th season of the 1re série, the top level of ice hockey in France. Chamonix Hockey Club won their 17th league title.

Final ranking
 1st place: Chamonix Hockey Club
 2nd place: Athletic Club de Boulogne-Billancourt
 3rd place: Ours de Villard-de-Lans
 4th place: St. Didier
 5th place: US Métro
 6th place: Diables Rouges de Briançon
 7th place: Gap Hockey Club
 8th place: Paris HC
 9th place: ?
 10th place: Club des Sports de Megève

External links
List of French champions on hockeyarchives.info

Fra
1958–59 in French ice hockey
Ligue Magnus seasons